Callipta oberthuri is a species of leaf beetle of Tunisia and Algeria, described by Léon Fairmaire in 1876.

References

Eumolpinae
Beetles of North Africa
Beetles described in 1876
Taxa named by Léon Fairmaire